Natalya Yermolovich (born April 29, 1964 in Homel, Belarus) is a retired female javelin thrower who represented the Soviet Union at the 1988 Summer Olympics. She was born Natalya Kalenchukova. Yermolovich set her personal best (69.86 metres) in 1985.

Achievements

References

sports-reference

1964 births
Living people
Belarusian female javelin throwers
Soviet female javelin throwers
Athletes (track and field) at the 1988 Summer Olympics
Olympic athletes of the Soviet Union
Goodwill Games medalists in athletics
Competitors at the 1986 Goodwill Games